José Pérez (September 2, 1898 – death unknown), nicknamed "Pepín", was a Cuban first baseman in the Negro leagues and the Cuban League in the 1920s and 1930s.

A native of Marianao, Cuba, Pérez made his Negro leagues debut in 1922 for the Cuban Stars (East), and played the majority of his career with the club. He also played two seasons with the Harrisburg Giants in 1926 and 1927, and played multiple seasons in the Cuban League with Almendares, Marianao, and the Leopardos de Santa Clara.

References

External links
 and Baseball-Reference Black Baseball stats and Seamheads

1898 births
Place of death missing
Year of death missing
Almendares (baseball) players
Cuban Stars (East) players
Cuban Stars (West) players
Harrisburg Giants players
Leopardos de Santa Clara players
Marianao players
Baseball infielders